Ängelby is a Swedish television drama series created by Johan Kindblom and Tomas Tivemark, first broadcast by SVT in 2015. The series, which premiered on 28 September 2015 on SVT1 and was broadcast on ITV Encore in the UK from 31 August 2016, follows Vera Fors (Mia Skäringer), an ordinary mother-of-two whose life is turned upside down by a tragic event. After her husband has an affair with another woman, Vera loses the job that her husband got her, and desperately seeking new employment, she responds to a job vacancy in Ängelby, a small remote suburban city.

As Vera seeks the opportunity to start a new life, she makes the decision to take the children and move to Ängelby. But on the way, tragedy strikes when Vera appears to hit and kill a teenage ice-hockey star. In shock, Vera runs from the crime scene, but when she reports the incident to the police the next day, she discovers the boy's body has disappeared. Despite the incident, Vera becomes determined to make a life for herself in Ängelby. However, she soon comes to realise that the boy's disappearance is just the beginning of a series of strange and unpleasant events to occur in Ängelby, forcing Vera to make the decision to get to the bottom of things.

SVT confirmed that following positive reception and strong international sales for the first series, a second series has entered production.

Cast
 Mia Skäringer as Vera Fors
 Göran Ragnerstam as Torsten Huzell
 Joel Spira as Amos Poe
 Michaela Thorsén as Viveka Wallström
 Anna Bjelkerud as Lärarinnan Eva Lindgren
 Amanda Ooms as Britt-Louise Vogel
 Linda Molin as Therese Malm
 Melker Wernberg as Calle Weltman 
 Sigrid Högberg as Tova Fors 
 Viktor Larsson as Espen Fors
 Jonas Sjöqvist as Jakob Medin
 Jerker Fahlström as Rune Eskilsson 
 Pär Luttropp as Markus Blom
 Timo Nieminen	as Rudi Malm 
 Örjan Landström as John Wallin
 Danilo Bejarano as Daniel Schiller 
 Gunilla Johansson as Martha Wallin
 Marall Nasiri	as Elsie Lantz

Episodes

Series 1 (2015)

References

External links
 

Sveriges Television original programming
2015 Swedish television series debuts
Swedish drama television series
Mystery television series
Thriller television series
Television shows set in Sweden